Amandla is a 2022 film directed and written by Nerina De Jager and starring Lemogang Tsipa, Thabo Rametsi and Israel Matseke-Zulu. The film was released on January 21, 2022, on Netflix.

Cast 
 Lemogang Tsipa as Impi
 Thabo Rametsi as Nkosana
 Israel Matseke-Zulu as Shaka (as Israel Makoe)
 Charlie Bouguenon as Drill Sergeant
 Jaco Muller as Klein
 Jacques Pepler as Rookie 1
 Liza Van Deventer as Elizabeth
 Marnitz van Deventer as Pieter
 Lucky Koza as Officer Lekgalagadi
 Rowlen Ethelbert von Gericke as Simon
 Paballo Koza as Phakiso

References

External links
 
 

2022 films
English-language Netflix original films
South African crime drama films
2022 crime films